Frederick George Birnstihl (16 October 1904 – 12 July 1983) was an Australian rules footballer who played with Footscray in the Victorian Football League (VFL).

Notes

External links 
		

1904 births
1983 deaths
VFL/AFL players born outside Australia
Australian rules footballers from Victoria (Australia)
Western Bulldogs players
Leopold Football Club (MJFA) players
German emigrants to Australia